Licking Fingers is a Swedish independent record label run by and affiliated with The Concretes, a Swedish indie-pop band. It was formed in Stockholm sometime between 1997 and 1999. The Concretes and Frida Hyvönen have released music through this imprint.

Bands and artists 
The Concretes
El Perro del Mar
Frida Hyvönen

See also
 List of record labels

External links
 Licking Fingers
 The Concretes
 Frida Hyvönen

Swedish independent record labels
Indie rock record labels